Song Qing is the name of:

Song Qing (Qing dynasty) (1820–1902), Qing dynasty general
Song Qing (Water Margin), fictional Song dynasty hero in the Chinese novel Water Margin